Tallabogue is a stream in the U.S. state of Mississippi. It is a tributary to the Leaf River.

Tallabogue is a name derived from the Choctaw language purported to mean "palmetto creek". A variant name is "Tallabogue Creek".

References

Rivers of Mississippi
Rivers of Scott County, Mississippi
Rivers of Smith County, Mississippi
Mississippi placenames of Native American origin